Lowitt is a surname. Notable people with the surname include:

Adam Lowitt, American standup comedian
Richard Lowitt (1922–2018), American historian

See also
Lewitt

English-language surnames